Ian Stephens (born 22 May 1952) is a former  international rugby union player. A prop, he toured twice with the British & Irish Lions, to South Africa in 1980 and New Zealand in 1983 and at the time played club rugby for Bridgend RFC.

References

1952 births
Living people
Bridgend RFC players
British & Irish Lions rugby union players from Wales
Rugby union players from Cardiff
Rugby union props
Welsh rugby union players